Hydridotetrakis(triphenylphosphine)rhodium(I) is the coordination complex with the formula HRh[P(C6H5)3]4.  It consists of a Rh(I) center complexed to four triphenylphosphine (PPh3) ligands and one hydride. The molecule has idealized C3v symmetry.   The compound is a homogeneous catalyst for hydrogenation and related reactions.  It is a yellow solid that dissolves in aromatic solvents.

Preparation
In the presence of base, H2, and additional triphenylphosphine, Wilkinson's catalyst (chloridotris(triphenylphosphane)rhodium(I)) converts to HRh(PPh3)4:
RhCl(PPh3)3  +  H2  +  KOH  +  PPh3  →  RhH(PPh3)4  +  H2O  +  KCl

References

Rhodium(I) compounds
Catalysts
Homogeneous catalysis
Triphenylphosphine complexes
Coordination complexes
Hydrogenation catalysts